Centromerus sylvaticus is a species of sheetweb spider in the family Linyphiidae. It is found in North America, Europe, Turkey, a range from Russia (European to Far East), China, Korea, and Japan.

Subspecies
These two subspecies belong to the species Centromerus sylvaticus:
 (Centromerus sylvaticus sylvaticus) (Blackwall, 1841)
 Centromerus sylvaticus paucidentatus Deltshev, 1983

References

External links

 

Linyphiidae
Articles created by Qbugbot
Spiders described in 1841